Disconnected is the ninth studio album by progressive metal band Fates Warning, released on July 25, 2000, through Metal Blade Records.  Kevin Moore previously played on the Fates Warning album A Pleasant Shade of Gray and later appeared in OSI with Matheos.

The album was re-released in Germany in 2006 as part of a two-CD set with the album Inside Out featuring bonus tracks

Track listing

Personnel 

 Ray Alder – vocals
 Jim Matheos – guitars, additional keyboards, sequencing, effects 
 Mark Zonder – drums
 Joey Vera – bass
 Kevin Moore – keyboards
 Steve Tushar – additional keyboards, sequencing, effects
 Laurie Matheos – voices
 Amy Motta – voices
 Bernie Altman – voices

Credits
 Fates Warning – producer
 Terry Brown – producer
 Phil Magnotti – drum and keyboard recording at Frankie's Hideaway, North Hollywood, California, mixing at Carriage House, digital editing, masting at Barking Doctor Studios
 Terry Brown – vocals, guitar and additional keyboard recording at Carriage House, Stamford, Connecticut
 Jim Matheos – additional vocals recording
 Joey Vera – additional vocals recording
 Laurie Matheos – superfluous voices, whispers and verbal meandering
 Amy Motta – superfluous voices, whispers and verbal meandering
 Bernie Altman – superfluous voices, whispers and verbal meandering
 George Hideous – superfluous voices, whispers and verbal meandering
 Fidel Horrendous – superfluous voices, whispers and verbal meandering
 Arthur Letsgoberg – superfluous voices, whispers and verbal meandering
 John Shyloski – assistant engineer
 Tom Bender – mastering at Barking Doctor Studios
 Alex Solca – photography

References

Fates Warning albums
2000 albums
Metal Blade Records albums